Hamoud Abuu Jumaa (born 10 July 1970) is a Tanzanian CCM politician and Member of Parliament for Kibaha Rural constituency since 2010.

References

1970 births
Living people
Chama Cha Mapinduzi MPs
Tanzanian MPs 2010–2015